The 2014–15 season was FC Dinamo București's 66th consecutive season in Liga I. In this season, Dinamo played in Liga I, Cupa României and Cupa Ligii. Dinamo continued its insolvency procedure, thus the club could not buy any player, bringing only free agents and players on loan.

Flavius Stoican remained the club manager for the first months of the season, but resigned in November. The general director Ionel Dănciulescu was named caretaker manager until the end of the year. In January 2015, Mihai Teja, former manager of the national U-21 squad, signed a contract for 18 months, but was sacked in March, after only five games in charge. Stoican was brought back for the end of the season.

On 6 May, Stoican ended his contract with Dinamo, leaving the club for the second time this season. His place was taken by Mircea Rednic who returned to Dinamo for his third spell as head coach.

Players

Squad changes

Transfers in:

Transfers out:

Loans in:

Loans out:

Squad statistics

Statistics accurate as of match played 29 May 2015

Disciplinary record
Includes all competitive matches.

Last updated on 29 May 2015

Competitions

Liga I

Standings

Results summary

Results by round

Competitive

Liga I
Kickoff times are in EET.

Cupa României

Cupa Ligii

References

External links
soccerway
Liga1.ro
romaniansoccer.ro

2014-15
Romanian football clubs 2014–15 season